Netball at the 1983 South Pacific Games in Apia, Samoa was held from 5–16 September 1983.

This was the fifth competition at the South Pacific Games for netball. The winner of the event were the Cook Islands over the Fiji. Tonga took home the bronze.

Final standings

See also
 Netball at the Pacific Games

References

1983 Pacific Games
South Pacific Games
Netball at the Pacific Games
South Pacific